Dancer is a 2016 American documentary film directed by Steven Cantor.

Synopsis 
Sergei Polunin is a breathtaking ballet talent who questions his existence and his commitment to dance just as he is about to become a legend.

Reception 
Upon its release the film received generally positive reviews. The Independent reviewer Geoffrey Macnab praised the film's usage of archival sources, described it as "poignant", and gave four out of five stars. Reviewing from The Irish Times, Tara Brady complimented Polunin's performance and also awarded the film four stars. Wendy Ide from The Guardian praised the archive footage and called it a "handsome documentary does a fine job of both capturing the breathtaking precision and physicality of Polunin at the top of his game". However, she criticised that "the truth is rather more complex than the unsettled family background that is squarely blamed", and gave the film three stars. In a mixed review, Peter Bradshew from The Guardian critiqued the film as "a sympathetic, serviceable but respectfully unintrusive documentary".

Awards

References

External links 

 

2016 films
2016 documentary films
American documentary films